Copehill Down is a Ministry of Defence training facility near Chitterne on Salisbury Plain, Wiltshire, England. It is a 'FIBUA' (Fighting In Built Up Areas) urban warfare and close quarters battle training centre, where exercises and tests are conducted.

The site lies in open ground in the northeast of Chitterne parish, between Chitterne and Tilshead, at Ordnance Survey .The facility was built in 1987 to resemble a German village in Bavaria, to provide troops with a simulated backdrop when training for operations in European theatres including the Cold War, the Balkans and Northern Ireland.

The facility includes a shanty town made up of cargo containers stacked and laid out in rows of tightly packed streets, to provide an additional training area that more closely resembles the Army's operational theatres in Afghanistan and Iraq.

Non-combat access to Copehill Down is generally restricted, however the facility has been used for airsoft wargaming and by historical reenactment societies, which take part in private reenactments of battles.

References

External links
Copehill Down at hiddenwiltshire.com
Photos of Copehill Down at Thinctanc
Copehill Down FIBUA training Village – description and pictures from urban exploration
Robots battle for military prize – 2007 BBC report on the use of Copehill Down for testing surveillance robots in urban areas
In Pictures: Grand Challenge – images related to the above; see picture 3

Military history of Wiltshire
Military training establishments of the United Kingdom
Urban warfare